Yves Verhoeven (born 27 October 1961) is a French actor. He has appeared in more than eighty films since 1989.

Selected filmography

References

External links 

Agency portrait

1961 births
Living people
French male film actors
People from Seine-Maritime
20th-century French male actors
21st-century French male actors